Azadeh Shafiq (1951 – 23 February 2011) was an Iranian royal and a member of the Pahlavi dynasty, being daughter of Ashraf Pahlavi. Following the Iranian revolution that toppled her uncle, Mohammad Reza Pahlavi, she exiled in Paris and involved in opposition activities to the Islamic regime in Iran.

Early life and education
Shafiq was born in 1951. She was the daughter of Ashraf Pahlavi, twin sister of the Shah Mohammad Reza, and her Egyptian second husband, Ahmad Shafiq. She had a brother, Shahriar. Although her parents were divorced in 1960, her father did not return to Egypt and stayed in Tehran to raise his children.

She was educated in German school in Tehran and in France.

Personal life and activities
Shafiq married twice. She married Farshad Vahid in 1972 and they had a son, Kamran (born 1973). She divorced from Vahid in 1975. She later wed a former Iranian military officer.

She began to live in Paris following the Iranian revolution. Later her brother joined her and they shared the Ashraf Pahlavi's residence near Rue Pergolese. They both acted as the Pahlavi family's principal spokesmen. She participated in protests and opposition activities against the Islamic regime. She supported efforts to restore the monarchy in Iran and headed a monarchist group, Free Iran movement in Paris. In 1979 she began to publish a weekly magazine, Iran-e Azad, which was disbanded in the 1980s. She served as a social and humanitarian worker with the Iranian community in Turkey from 1984 to 1991.

Death
Shafiq died of leukemia in Paris on 23 February 2011.

References

External links

20th-century Iranian women politicians
21st-century Iranian women politicians
1951 births
2011 deaths
Deaths from cancer in France
Deaths from leukemia
Exiles of the Iranian Revolution in France
Iranian activists
Iranian emigrants to France
Iranian people of Egyptian descent
Mazandarani people
Pahlavi princesses
People of the Iranian Revolution